Igor Anatolyevich Gavrilin (born 14 September 1971 in Moscow, Russia) is a Russian rugby league footballer and rugby union coach who plays as centre. He is currently the acting coach of the Adrenalin  rugby union club from Tyumen (sometimes acting as a playing coach)  and head coach of the Tyumen region Rugby Union.

He is known for his performances for RC Lokomotiv Moscow in the Championship of Russia competition, five-times champion of Russia. Gavrilin has also represented the Russian national side on several occasions, most notably at the 2000 World Cup. After completing his playing career in the mid-2000s, he took up teaching and coaching. Works as a physical education teacher at school №34 and forms the rugby team "T-34" on the basis of the school. Since 2010 he has been coaching the Tyumen-based club Adrenalin. In 2013 he announced the holding of the first rugby tournament in Tyumen.

References

External links
Igor Gavrilin player profile

1971 births
Sportspeople from Moscow
Russian rugby league players
Russia national rugby league team players
Living people
Rugby articles needing expert attention